is a Japanese figure skater. She is the 2022 JGP Italy champion, the 2022 JGP France champion, the 2022 Bavarian Open Junior champion, the 2022 Egna Spring Trophy champion, the 2019 Japanese Junior National bronze medalist, and the 2020 Japanese Junior National silver medalist. Yoshida is the nineteenth woman to successfully land a triple Axel in international competition.

Career

Early years 
Yoshida began skating in 2012. She placed ninth at the 2015 Japan Novice B National Championships but won the category the next year.

2017–18 season 
Yoshida won the 2017 Japan Novice National Championships and was invited to compete at the 2017 Japan National Championships. She placed eighth overall. She was also invited to skate in the gala at the 2017 NHK Trophy as the 2017 Japanese national novice champion.

Yoshida was sent to the 2018 Challenge Cup, winning the advanced novice ladies ahead of Alysa Liu of United States.

2018–19 season 
In August 2018, Yoshida competed at the 2018 Asian Open Trophy. She attempted the triple Axel in the free program but fell, ranking third overall.

2019–20 season 
Yoshida competed at the 2019 Japan Junior National Championships. She placed tenth in the short program. However, Yoshida landed a clean triple Axel in the free and won the bronze medal. Due to the results, she was invited to compete at the senior division. Yoshida finished in nineteenth place.

2020–21 season 
The 2020–21 Junior Grand Prix circuit was cancelled due to the COVID-19 pandemic. Yoshida was then invited to compete at the 2020 Japan Open as part of Team Blue. She attempted the triple Axel unsuccessfully. She won the silver medal at the 2020 Japan Junior Nationals behind Rino Matsuike, then placing sixteenth at the senior event.

2021–22 season 
Yoshida placed fourth at the 2021 Japan Junior National Championships. She was invited to the senior event because the junior champion Mao Shimada was too young to compete. She placed ninth overall.

Yoshida attended the 2022 Bavarian Open to compete in the Junior Women II category. She placed first in the short even though she popped the planned triple flip. Yoshida landed a clean triple Axel in the free skate, becoming the nineteenth woman to land the jump in an international competition successfully. She won over Japan's Rinka Watanabe. Also eligible to compete at the senior level, she was sent to 2022 Egna Spring Trophy. Yoshida landed the triple Axel in the short and another one in the free, but the jump was landed on the quarter. She won by outscoring South Korea's Lee Hae-in by 28.45 points.

2022–23 season: Junior Grand Prix debut 
In August 2022, Yoshida debuted on the Junior Grand Prix at the 2022 JGP France in Courchevel. In her short program, she underrotated both jumps in her combination but otherwise gave a clean skate which placed her second behind her teammate Ayumi Shibayama and earned her the highest program components score awarded in that segment of the competition. During the free skate, Yoshida successfully landed a triple Axel but stepped out after the landing. Although her triple flip's edge was marked as unclear, and the first jump in her triple Lutz-triple toe combination was underrotated by a quarter, she had no falls, and the program was otherwise clean. She won the event with a lead of 15.13 points over Shibayama, who finished in second place. Yoshida became the first Japanese woman to win a Junior Grand Prix competition since Rika Kihira in 2016. Yoshida was initially scheduled to compete at the Armenian stop on the Junior Grand Prix circuit. However, when that was cancelled due to the September conflict between Azerbaijan and Armenia, she was reassigned elsewhere. Yoshida won a second gold medal at the 2022 JGP Italy, in the process qualifying for the 2022–23 Junior Grand Prix Final.

Yoshida entered the Final in Turin as a medal favourite after winning both of her qualifying events, but she finished sixth of sixth skaters in the short program after falling on her jump combination, which she called "very disappointing." The free skate proved no better, opening with a fall on an underrotated triple Axel and going on to make several other jump errors, including a singled attempt at a triple Lutz. She was again last in the segment and last overall.

Competing at the senior 2022–23 Japan Championships, Yoshida erred on two jumps in the short program, placing fourteenth in that segment. In the free skate she successfully landed a triple Axel and seven other triple jumps, placing third in that segment and rising to sixth overall. She was assigned to compete at the 2023 Four Continents Championships. Yoshida went on to finish eighth at the Four Continents Championships.

Programs

Competitive highlights 
JGP: Junior Grand Prix

Detailed results 
Current personal best scores are highlighted in bold.

References

External links 
 
 Hanna Yoshida on Instagram

Japanese female single skaters
Living people
2005 births
Sportspeople from Aichi Prefecture